The Lille Congress was the twelfth national congress of the French Socialist Party (Parti socialiste or PS). It took place from 3 to 5 April 1987.

Results

Lionel Jospin was elected as First Secretary. In 1988, he was replaced by Pierre Mauroy.

References

Congresses of the Socialist Party (France)
1987 in France
1987 in politics
1987 conferences